The 1991 Pacific Curling Championships was held at the Ginga Arena in Sagamihara, Japan from November 28 to 30. It was the first edition of the Pacific Curling Championship as it saw Australia and Japan win the men's and women's titles respectively.

Men's

Standings

Results

Draw 1

Draw 2

Draw 3

Draw 4

Draw 5

Draw 6

Women's

Result

References

General

Specific

Pacific Curling Championships, 2005
Pacific-Asia Curling Championships
International curling competitions hosted by Japan
Pacific Curling Championships
Sagamihara
Pacific Curling Championships